Kamdara is a village in the Kamdara CD block in the Basia subdivision of the Gumla district in the Indian state of Jharkhand.

Geography

Location                           
Kamdara is located at

Area overview 
The map alongside presents a rugged area, consisting partly of flat-topped hills called pat and partly of an undulating plateau, in the south-western portion of Chota Nagpur Plateau. Three major rivers – the Sankh, South Koel and North Karo - along with their numerous tributaries, drain the area. The hilly area has large deposits of Bauxite. 93.7% of the population lives in rural areas.

Note: The map alongside presents some of the notable locations in the district. All places marked in the map are linked in the larger full screen map.

Civic administration  
There is a police station at Kamdara. 
 
The headquarters of Kamdara CD block are located at Kamdara village.

Demographics 
According to the 2011 Census of India, Kamdara had a total population of 3,742, of which 1,771 (47%) were males and 1,971 (53%) were females. Population in the age range 0–6 years was 520. The total number of literate persons in Kamdara was 2,618 (81.25% of the population over 6 years).

(*For language details see Kamdara block#Language and religion)

Education
Glossop Memorial High School Kamdara is a Hindi-medium coeducational institution established in 1952.t has facilities for teaching from class VI to class X. The school has a playground, a library with 200 books and has 2 computers for teaching and learning purposes.

Kasturba Gandhi Balika Vidyalaya is a Hindi-medium girls only institution established in 2007. It has facilities for teaching from class VI to class XII. The school has a playground, a library with 721 books and has 5 computers for learning and teaching purposes.

Project Girls High School is a Hindi-medium girls only institution established in 1983.It has facilities for teaching from class VI to class X. The school has a library with 59 books.

References 

Villages in Gumla district